Schooled may refer to:

 Schooled (magazine), a monthly magazine based in Provo, Utah
 "Schooled" (Modern Family), an episode of Modern Family
 Schooled (novel), written by Gordon Korman
 Schooled (TV series), a 2019 American comedy series, direct spin-off to The Goldbergs
 "Schooled!", an episode of the animated series The Loud House

See also 
 School (disambiguation)